The Southern Championships also known as the Southern Sectional Championships  was a men's and women's grass court then later clay tournament staged annually at various locations from 1885 until 1978. The tournament is still being held today as the USTA Southern Championships.

History
In 1882 the Delaware Field Club in Willmington, Delaware, United States was founded, and officially incorporated in 1885. On 1 October 1885 the first Southern Championships were inaugurated at the venue, and the first men's champion was Charles Belmont Davis who later became an author. 

A women's championship event was added to the schedule in 1901 and was held at the Bachelors Lawn Tennis Club, Washington D.C. which was won by Marion Jones  In 1978 the final championships were played at Greenville, South Carolina that were then part of the official USTA southern circuit. The final men's champion was won by the Paraguyan player Francisco Gonzalez, the final ladies champion was Zenda Liess. The tournament was still being held in 1999 where it was known as the Southern Adult Clay Court Open.

Locations
The championships have been played in the following cities; Atlanta, Georgia, Birmingham, Alabama, Jackson, Mississippi, Louisville, Kentucky, Memphis, Tennessee, New Orleans, Louisiana. Raleigh, North Carolina and Washington D.C., Wilmington, Delaware

References

Clay court tennis tournaments
Grass court tennis tournaments
Defunct tennis tournaments in the United States